The 2005 Italian Grand Prix (officially the Formula 1 Gran Premio Vodafone d'Italia 2005)  was a Formula One motor race held on 4 September 2005 at the Autodromo Nazionale di Monza, Italy. It was the fifteenth race of the 2005 FIA Formula One World Championship. The 53-lap race was won from pole position by Colombia's Juan Pablo Montoya, driving a McLaren-Mercedes, with Renault drivers Fernando Alonso and Giancarlo Fisichella second and third respectively. Kimi Räikkönen was fourth, thus losing ground to Alonso at the top of the Drivers' Championship. Antônio Pizzonia scored his last world championship points at this race.

Friday drivers 
The bottom 6 teams in the 2004 Constructors' Championship were entitled to run a third car in free practice on Friday. These drivers drove on Friday but did not compete in qualifying or the race.

Report

Kimi Räikkönen set the fastest time in qualifying in his McLaren-Mercedes, but received a 10-place grid penalty for changing his engine, demoting him to 11th on the grid and giving pole to teammate Juan Pablo Montoya.

Montoya led every lap, winning by 2.5 seconds from the Renault of Fernando Alonso, with Giancarlo Fisichella third in the other Renault. Räikkönen climbed through the field to finish fourth, ahead of Jarno Trulli, Ralf Schumacher, Antônio Pizzonia and Jenson Button. Räikkönen would have had a chance of winning with a one-stop strategy, but a deflated tyre forced him to make a second pit stop. Rubens Barrichello also had the same problem later in the day, and Montoya was lucky to finish in the lead, as his left rear tyre began to cut with several laps remaining.

Alonso extended his lead over Räikkönen in the Drivers' Championship to 27 points, 103 to 76, with Michael Schumacher third on 55 and Montoya fourth on 50. Mathematically, the championship was now a two-horse race between Alonso and Räikkönen. Renault retained an eight-point lead over McLaren-Mercedes in the Constructors' Championship, 144 to 136, Ferrari remaining in third on 86 and Toyota fourth on 78.

There were no retirements during the race, a feat that had not been achieved in Formula One with a full field since the 1961 Dutch Grand Prix, and would not be achieved again until the 2011 European Grand Prix. The 2005 United States Grand Prix is also considered to have had no retirements; however, only six cars started due to problems with the supply of Michelin tyres, which led to the mass withdrawal of all teams running on those tyres due to safety issues. Pizzonia replaced Nick Heidfeld for the rest of the season onwards.

Classification

Qualifying 

Note: Kimi Räikkönen had a 10-place grid penalty for this race, for an engine change.

Race

Championship standings after the race 
Bold text indicates who still has a theoretical chance of becoming World Champion.

Drivers' Championship standings

Constructors' Championship standings

See also 
 2005 Monza GP2 Series round

References 

Italian Grand Prix
Italian Grand Prix
Grand Prix
September 2005 sports events in Europe